Budăi may refer to the following places:

Romania
 Budăi, a village administered by Podu Iloaiei town, Iaşi County
 Budăi, hill in the proximity of Călugăreni in Botoşani County

Moldova
 Budăi, Taraclia, a commune in Taraclia district
 Budăi, Teleneşti, a commune in Teleneşti district
 Budăi, a village in Ţipala Commune, Ialoveni district
 Budăi, a village in Step-Soci Commune, Orhei district